Stanislav Vadimovich Kokoyev (born 13 November 1985) is a former Russian professional football player.

Club career
He played two seasons in the Russian Football National League for FC Alania Vladikavkaz and FC Nosta Novotroitsk.

External links
 
 

1985 births
Sportspeople from Vladikavkaz
Living people
Russian footballers
Association football midfielders
FC Spartak Vladikavkaz players
FC Nosta Novotroitsk players